The Sabula Rail Bridge is a swing bridge that carries a single rail line across the Mississippi River between the island town of Sabula, Iowa and Savanna, Illinois. Originally built for the Milwaukee Road, and subsequently owned by the Iowa, Chicago and Eastern Railroad, the bridge is operational and is currently owned by Canadian Pacific Railway.

2014 Barge Accident
On April 8, 2014, the Sabula Railway bridge was struck by the Marquette Transportation Barge Wisconsin. No one was injured. The Sabula Fire Department was called alongside the Sabula ambulance crew to search for a missing bargeman, but he was later found on the barge unharmed. The protective wooden barrier was almost completely destroyed by the barge. The incident as of the day of the accident was investigated by the U.S. Coast Guard and Canadian Pacific Railway Police, with the assistance of the Sabula Fire Department, who provided their rescue boat as transportation until additional boats arrived. As of 2015, the bridge has been completely repaired.

See also
List of crossings of the Upper Mississippi River

References

Railroad bridges in Iowa
Railroad bridges in Illinois
Bridges over the Mississippi River
Swing bridges in the United States
Canadian Pacific Railway bridges in the United States
Chicago, Milwaukee, St. Paul and Pacific Railroad
Steel bridges in the United States
Transportation buildings and structures in Jackson County, Iowa
Transportation buildings and structures in Carroll County, Illinois
Interstate railroad bridges in the United States